Sfax–Thyna International Airport  is an airport serving Sfax in Tunisia. The airport is located 6 kilometers (4 miles) southwest from Sfax.

History

World War II
During World War II, the airport was known as Sfax Airfield and was used by the United States Army Air Forces Ninth Air Force during the North African Campaign. Known units assigned were:
 12th Bombardment Group, 15 April – 2 June 1943, B-25 Mitchell
 340th Bombardment Group, 15 April – 2 June 1943, B-25 Mitchell

Later years
The airport has undergone several extensions and improvements. The most important development and remodeling of the terminal took place in 1988 when the runway was extended. In 1989 a cargo terminal was added and in 1996 new facilities were built: warehouse, taxiways and the airport apron was reconstructed. Additionally the runway was improved and a new control tower was built.

With a capacity of 200,000 passengers per year, the current terminal covers 2,000 m2 (½ acre). A new terminal building covers 8000 m2 (2 acres), consisting of three buildings. Construction started on 8 November 2005, and it was inaugurated on 22 December 2007. With a total cost of six million dinars, it has a capacity of 500,000 passengers. A total budget of 25 million dinars was also devoted to the airport to give it a total facelift (control tower, runway and parking).

From 2011 the airport was the main hub and headquarters for Syphax Airlines up until 2015.

Airlines and destinations
The following airlines operate regular scheduled and charter flights at Sfax–Thyna Airport:

References

Citations

Bibliography
 Maurer, Maurer. Air Force Combat Units of World War II. Maxwell AFB, Alabama: Office of Air Force History, 1983. .

External links
 Tunisian Civil Aviation and Airports Authority (OACA)
 
 

Airports in Tunisia
Airport
World War II airfields in Tunisia
Airfields of the United States Army Air Forces in Tunisia
Airports established in 1980